Rommie Lee Loudd (June 8, 1933 – May 9, 1998) was an American former collegiate and professional American football player, coach, and executive. He was the first black assistant coach in the American Football League and the first black majority owner of a major league sports team.

Playing career
Loudd was born in Madisonville, Texas, and played tight end for coach Red Sanders at UCLA from 1953 to 1955. He was a member of the 1953 UCLA Bruins football team that lost in the 1954 Rose Bowl and a member of the  1954 UCLA Bruins football team that was declared the FWAA & UPI National Champions.

He was drafted by the San Francisco 49ers in the 26th round (304th overall) of the 1956 NFL Draft, but instead signed with the BC Lions of the Canadian Football League. After being cut by the Chicago Bears in 1959, Loudd joined the newly formed American Football League as a member of the Los Angeles Chargers. He was released by the Chargers after one season and signed with the AFL' Boston Patriots.

Coaching
In 1964, Loudd moved to coaching. He was the defensive coach of the Boston Sweepers of the Atlantic Coast Football League for two seasons before becoming the linebackers coach for the Boston Patriots and the first African-American coach in the history of the AFL. After two seasons as coach, Loudd moved to the front office, where he was the Patriots Director of Player Personnel from 1968 to 1971 and Director of Pro Scouting from 1971 to 1973.

In 1973, Loudd led a bid to get a National Football League franchise in Orlando, Florida. The expansion franchise would instead go to Philadelphia construction magnate Thomas McCloskey who founded the Tampa Bay Buccaneers. In 1974, Loudd became the owner of the Florida Blazers of the World Football League. He was the first black top executive in major league sports.
Loudd, one season, worked with Don Gillis for New England Patriots preseason.

Legal troubles
On April 3, 1957, Loudd was charged with child molestation. He and four other men allegedly engaged in sodomy and other sexual acts with three boys, ages twelve, thirteen, and fifteen, who were picked up off the street wearing wigs and women's clothing. He was found guilty on two charges of child molestation and sentenced to six months in jail and five years of probation.

On December 23, 1974, Loudd was arrested on charges of embezzling state sales tax money. Three months later he was charged with conspiracy and delivery of cocaine.  He was sentenced to two concurrent fourteen-year sentences for conviction on two counts of delivering cocaine. He was also sentenced to two years in prison for possession and distribution of cocaine. The sales tax embezzlement and conspiracy to deliver cocaine charges were dropped following his convictions on drug charges. After three years in prison, Loudd was released on parole. and became an associate minister at Mount Tabor Baptist Church.

Death
Loudd died on May 9, 1998, in Miami, Florida, aged 64, of complications from diabetes.

See also
 List of American Football League players

References

External links
 Loudd's 1960 Fleer football card

1933 births
1998 deaths
American football tight ends
American football linebackers
American Football League players
American drug traffickers
American people convicted of child sexual abuse
Baptists from Texas
BC Lions players
Boston Patriots players
Boston Patriots coaches
Boston Patriots (AFL) coaches
Deaths from diabetes
National Football League announcers
New England Patriots announcers
New England Patriots executives
New England Patriots scouts
People from Madisonville, Texas
Sportspeople from Newport Beach, California
Players of American football from Miami
Players of Canadian football from Miami
Sportspeople from Miami
UCLA Bruins football players
20th-century Baptists
Los Angeles Chargers players